John D. H. Downing is a communications scholar who has written extensively on Alternative Media and Social Movements. He is Professor Emeritus of International Communication at the College of Mass Communication & Media Arts, Southern Illinois University and currently affiliated with Northwestern University in Qatar. He is founding Director of the Global Media Research Center.

Education
 Ph.D. at London School of Economics and Political Science, 1974.  Thesis title: Some aspects of the presentation of industrial relations and race relations in some major British news media 
 MSc Econ at London School of Economics and Political Science, 1968
 MA at Oxford University, 1968

Notable publications
 1996 Internationalizing Media Theory: transition, power, culture: reflections on Russia, Poland and Hungary 1980-95. Sage, London, UK.
  2001 (with Tamara Villarreal Ford, Genève Gil, Laura Stein): Radical Media: Rebellious Communication and Social Movements. Sage, Thousand Oaks, California.
 2010 Editor, Sage Encyclopedia of Social Movement Media, Sage, Thousand Oaks, CA.

References

External links 
 Faculty Listing for John Downing at SIUC

Living people
Year of birth missing (living people)
Place of birth missing (living people)
Alumni of the University of Oxford
Alumni of the London School of Economics
Southern Illinois University Carbondale faculty
Journalism academics